St Ursula's College or Saint Ursula's College may refer to the following schools in Australia:

 Saint Ursula's College, Kingsgrove, Sydney, New South Wales
 St Ursula's College, Toowoomba, Queensland
 St Ursula's College, Yeppoon, Queensland